Aaron Meade (born May 2, 1988) is an American baseball coach and former pitcher. He is the head baseball coach of the Tarleton State Texans. Meade played college baseball at Missouri State from 2007 to 2010 and in Minor League Baseball (MiLB) for four seasons from 2010 to 2013.

Playing career
Meade attended Rockhurst High School in Kansas City, Missouri, where he played for the school's baseball team. As a senior, he pitched in the All-Missouri East/West All-Star Game. After high school, Meade signed to play college baseball for the Missouri State Bears. In 2009, he played collegiate summer baseball with the Harwich Mariners of the Cape Cod Baseball League and was named a league all-star.

Coaching career
On August 20, 2015, Meade was hired as the pitching coach at Pittsburg State University.

On July 24, 2019, Meade was named the head baseball coach of the Tarleton State Texans.

Head coaching record

See also
 List of current NCAA Division I baseball coaches

References

External links

Tarleton State Texans profile

1988 births
Living people
Missouri State Bears baseball players
Harwich Mariners players
Arizona League Angels players
Orem Owlz players
Cedar Rapids Kernels players
Inland Empire 66ers of San Bernardino players
Kansas City T-Bones players
Missouri State Bears baseball coaches
William Jewell Cardinals baseball coaches
Pittsburg State Gorillas baseball coaches
Tarleton State Texans baseball coaches
Baseball players from Kansas City, Missouri